Succession of states is a concept in international relations regarding a successor state that has become a sovereign state over a territory (and populace) that was previously under the sovereignty of another state. The theory has its roots in 19th-century diplomacy. A successor state often acquires a new international legal personality, which is distinct from a continuing state, also known as a continuator or historical heir, which despite change to its borders retains the same legal personality and possess all its existing rights and obligations (such as a rump state).

Partial and universal state succession 
A state succession can be characterized as either being universal or partial. A universal state succession occurs when one state is completely extinguished and its sovereignty is replaced by that of one or more successor states. A partial state succession occurs when the state continues to exist after it has lost control of a part of its territory.

An example of a partial state succession is the case of the split of Bangladesh from Pakistan, there was no challenge to Pakistan's claim to continue to exist and to retain its membership of the United Nations: it was a continuator and not a successor. Bangladesh eventually was recognized as a new state: it was a successor and had to apply for UN membership.

An example of a universal state succession is the dissolution of Czechoslovakia. Neither part claimed any continuity: both the Czech Republic and Slovakia were new successor states.

Rights and obligations 
Consequent upon the acquisition of international legal personality, the difficult matter of succession to treaty rights and obligations arises. Succession may refer to the transfer of rights, obligations, or property from a previously well-established predecessor state to its successor state, and can include overseas assets such as diplomatic missions, foreign-exchange reserves, and museum artifacts; and participation in treaties in force at the date of succession or international organizations. In an attempt to codify the rules of succession of states, the 1978 Vienna Convention entered into force on November 6, 1996.

Classification of cases
In their application to the acquisition of independence, distinctions should be drawn between different cases though the line of demarcation is not always clear:

 Bilateral and multilateral treaties necessarily give rise to different considerations.
 There are real treaties and personal treaties. Real treaties affect the territory itself, such as boundary agreements or the grant of transit rights, which can continue irrespective of the personality of the state. The new state must take over the country in the condition in which it finds it, as the parent state cannot give more than it possesses. Such treaties can be described as "treaties creating purely local obligations."

Exceptions to orderly succession
There are several recent examples where a succession of states, as described above, has not been entirely adhered to. This is mostly a list of the exceptions that have occurred since the creation of the United Nations in 1945. In previous historical periods, the exceptions would be too many to list.

Afghanistan

The Taliban state in Afghanistan (the Islamic Emirate of Afghanistan) became the de facto government of nearly all the country in the mid-1990s, but the Afghan Northern Alliance was still recognised by many nations and retained the UN seat. In 2021, the Taliban again took power, but  it does not have the Afghanistan UN seat.

China

The People's Republic of China (PRC) was established in 1949 in mainland China and claimed succession from the Republic of China (ROC). The ROC's territory was reduced to mainly the island of Taiwan, although it continues to claim control of the mainland. At the start of the Cold War the PRC was recognized by few states; the ROC continued to represent "China" in the United Nations and hold the permanent seat on the UN Security Council. In 1971, the PRC replaced the ROC in the UN through General Assembly Resolution 2758, this followed a trend of greater recognition for the PRC at the expense of the ROC. Although the resolution makes no mention over Taiwan, the ROC continues to be unrepresented within the United Nations but exercises sovereignty over the Taiwan Area. Despite of the Chinese Mainland, the ROC also claims borderlands unclaimed by the PRC, most notably Outer Mongolia.

In Chinese history, periods of prolonged political division and dynastic transition saw the existence of more than one "China" at the same time. China was politically divided during several sustained periods historically, with two or more states simultaneously existing on territories associated with "China" and claiming to represent "China". Examples include the Spring and Autumn, Warring States, Three Kingdoms, Sixteen Kingdoms, Northern and Southern dynasties, Five Dynasties and Ten Kingdoms periods, Warlord Era and the Chinese Soviet Republic among others. Just as the PRC and the ROC formally claim exclusive mandate over the entirety of China, historical Chinese dynasties that existed during periods of sustained political disunity often claimed exclusive Chinese politico-cultural orthodoxy at the expense of others.

During dynastic transitions, it was rare for one dynasty to end abruptly and transition smoothly to a new one, resulting in the existence of more than one entity claiming to be "China". For instance, during the Ming–Qing transition, the Ming dynasty existed alongside the Qing dynasty from 1636 to 1644. The predecessor of the Qing dynasty, the Later Jin dynasty, was established in 1616 and ruled over northeastern China whilst the Ming dynasty ruled over China proper. Following the fall of the Ming dynasty in 1644, remnants of the Ming imperial family, whose regime is known in historiography as the Southern Ming dynasty, continued to rule parts of southern China until 1662. Multiple ephemeral regimes also existed during this period, including the Shun and Xi dynasties on mainland China, and the Ming loyalist Kingdom of Tungning on Taiwan.

Republic of Ireland

Ireland, then called the Irish Free State, seceded from the United Kingdom under the Anglo-Irish Treaty of 1922. The new state took the view that when a new state comes into being after formerly being part of an older state, its acceptance of treaty relationships established by the older state is a matter for the new state to determine by express declaration, or by conduct in the case of each individual treaty. In practice, however, the Irish regarded the commercial and administrative treaties of the United Kingdom of Great Britain and Ireland previously applying to the territory of the Irish Free State as remaining in force.

Israel

Israel took the view that, by virtue of its declaration of independence in 1948, a new international personality from Mandatory Palestine was created, and that it started with a clean slate, and was bound only by such of the former international obligations affecting the territory as Israel might accept.

Kampuchea/Cambodia

When Democratic Kampuchea led by Pol Pot was militarily displaced by the Vietnamese-backed People's Republic of Kampuchea, the country's United Nations seat was held by Democratic Kampuchea for many years. It is now held by the Kingdom of Cambodia.

Korea 

In 1919, when the Provisional Government of the Republic of Korea was formed it claimed continuity directly from their pre-1910 status. In 1948 when the modern Republic of Korea was formed it claimed that it was identical with Provisional Government of the Republic of Korea and that the Provisional Government succeeded the Korean Empire. An important tenet of the modern state of Republic of Korea is that the Korean Empire's incorporation into the Empire of Japan from 1910 to 1945 is internationally recognized as an illegal occupation.

South Korea resumed membership to international organizations such as the Universal Postal Union and re-affirmed that pre-1910 treaties were still in force.

Ottoman Empire/Turkey

There is some debate over whether the modern Republic of Turkey is a continuing state to the Ottoman Empire or a successor.  The two entities fought on opposing sides in the Turkish War of Independence (1919–23), and even briefly co-existed as separate administrative units (whilst at war with one another): Turkey with its capital in Angora (now Ankara) and the Ottoman Empire from Constantinople (now Istanbul), but this type of scenario is also common in civil wars. The Turkish National Movement, led by Mustafa Kemal who defected from the Ottoman Army, established the modern republic as a nation-state (or new government regime) by defeating the opposing elements in the Turkish War of Independence. There remains debate about whether the conflict was a war of independence, or a civil war that led to a regime change.

The question of state succession is relevant to the issue of Armenian genocide reparations.

Pakistan
When Pakistan became independent it claimed that it was automatically a member of the United Nations, as British India had been a founding member of the United Nations despite its colonial status. The United Nations Secretariat however expressed the following opinion:

Soviet Union

International convention since the end of the Cold War has come to distinguish two distinct circumstances where such privileges are sought by such a successor state, in only the first of which may such successor states assume the name or privileged international position of their predecessor. The first set of circumstances arose at the dissolution of the Union of Soviet Socialist Republics (USSR) in 1991. One of the constituent republics of the USSR, the Russian Federation has declared itself to be "the continuator state of the USSR" on the grounds that it contained 51% of the population of the USSR and 77% of its territory. Consequently, Russia agreed that it would acquire the USSR's seat as a permanent member of the United Nations Security Council. This was also accepted by the rest of the former states of the USSR; in a letter dated 24 December 1991, the Russian President Boris Yeltsin informed the Secretary-General that the membership of the USSR in the Security Council and all other United Nations organs was being continued by the Russian Federation with the support of the nine member countries of the Commonwealth of Independent States. All Soviet embassies became Russian embassies. Ukraine, the successor state of the Ukrainian Soviet Socialist Republic (legally) being one of the founding members of the Soviet Union, has not recognized the exclusive Russian claims to succession of the Soviet Union and claimed such status for Ukraine as well, which was stated in Articles 7 and 8 of Law on the Succession of Ukraine issued in 1991. After independence, Ukraine has continued to pursue claims against the Russian Federation in foreign courts, seeking to recover its share of the foreign property that was formerly owned by the Soviet Union.

A special case for the Baltic states had existed. An important tenet of the modern states of Estonia, Latvia and Lithuania is that their incorporation into the Soviet Union from 1940 to 1991 constituted an illegal occupation. In 1991 when each Baltic state regained their independence they claimed continuity directly from their pre-1940 status. Many other states share this view, and as such, these states were not considered either predecessor or successor states of the Soviet Union. As a consequence, the Baltic states were able to simply re-establish diplomatic relations with countries, re-affirm pre-1940 treaties still in force, and resume membership to international organizations. A similar situation applies to the Caucasus countries of Armenia, Azerbaijan and Georgia, which claimed continuity of the pre-1921 republics before being conquered by the Red Army as well as Ukraine, which as mentioned above, is the de facto successor to the Ukrainian People's Republic that was founded in 1917 before its Sovietization in 1919.

Yugoslavia

After four of the six constituent republics of the Socialist Federal Republic of Yugoslavia seceded in 1991 and 1992, the rump state, renamed the Federal Republic of Yugoslavia, stated it was the continuation of the Socialist Federal Republic of Yugoslavia—against the objections of the newly independent republics.  Representatives from Belgrade continued to hold the original Yugoslavian UN seat—however, the United States refused to recognize it. The remaining territory of the federation was less than half of the population and territory of the former federation.  In 1992 the Security Council on 19 September (Resolution 777) and the General Assembly on 22 September, decided to refuse to allow the new federation to sit in the General Assembly under the name of "Yugoslavia" on the theory that the Socialist Federal Republic of Yugoslavia had dissolved. The Federal Republic of Yugoslavia (later renamed Serbia and Montenegro) was admitted as a new member to the United Nations on 1 November 2000; in May 2006, Montenegro declared independence and Serbia continued to hold the federation's seat. Additionally, Kosovo declared independence in February 2008.

The Agreement on Succession Issues

The first negotiations on succession issues of the former Socialist Yugoslavia had begun in 1992 within the framework of the Working Group on Succession Issues of the Peace Conference on Yugoslavia. The agreement was initially prevented by the insistence of the Federal Republic of Yugoslavia that it is exclusive legal and political continuator of the Socialist Yugoslavia as well as the owner of all state property owned by the earlier socialist federal government, and was willing to renounce a part of it only as an act of goodwill. Federal Republic of Yugoslavia interpreted breakup of Yugoslavia as a process of serial secessions and not as a complete dismemberment of the earlier state, interpretation rejected by other former Yugoslav republics. Badinter Arbitration Committee recommended a division of assets and liabilities based on principle of equity and even referred to the 1983 Vienna Convention on Succession of States in Respect of State Property, Archives and Debt (convention not in force which at the time was signed by only six states, including SRF Yugoslavia). This proposal was unacceptable to the Federal Republic of Yugoslavia which therefore motivated the International Monetary Fund to develop alternative key model which included economic power of republics and their contribution to the federal budget which was accepted by all. The key determined participation of Federal Republic of Yugoslavia with 36.52%, Croatia with 28.49%, Slovenia 16.39%, Bosnia and Herzegovina with 13.20% and Macedonia with 5.20%. Agreement was also reached on gold and other reserves at the Bank for International Settlements but the final conclusion was postponed by the beginning of the Kosovo War.

After the end of the NATO bombing of Yugoslavia followed next year by the overthrow of Slobodan Milošević successor states concluded their agreement. In 2001, with the support of the international community, five countries (Slovenia, Croatia, Bosnia and Herzegovina,  The Former Yugoslav Republic of Macedonia – today North Macedonia — and the Federal Republic of Yugoslavia – today Serbia and Montenegro) signed the Agreement on Succession Issues which conclusively confirmed that five sovereign equal successor states were formed upon the dissolution of the former SFR Yugoslavia. It entered into force on 2 June 2004 when the last successor state ratified it. The agreement was signed as an umbrella agreement which included annexes on diplomatic and consular properties, financial assets and liabilities, archives, pensions, other rights, interests and liabilities as well as private properties and acquired rights. At the subsequent dissolution of the state union of Serbia and Montenegro (one of the five successor states) two countries agreed on Serbian sole succession of rights and obligations of their federation.

Examples
 Serbia, successor state to the Federal Republic of Yugoslavia (earlier claim to SFR Yugoslavia succession dropped in 2000)
 The Islamic Republic of Iran, successor state to the Imperial State of Iran
 The Republic of Indonesia, the current successor state of the Dutch East Indies
 Sudan, the reduced state after the creation of South Sudan.
 Predecessors of sovereign states in Africa
 Predecessors of sovereign states in Asia
 Predecessors of sovereign states in North America
 Predecessors of sovereign states in South America
 Predecessors of sovereign states in Europe
 Predecessors of sovereign states in Oceania

See also
 Comparative history
 International law
 Translatio imperii
 Universal history
 Vienna Convention on Succession of States in respect of Treaties
 State continuity of the Baltic states
 Timeline of historical geopolitical changes
 Peaceful transition of power
 Odious debt
 Rump state

References

Bibliography
 Burgenthal/Doehring/Kokott: Grundzüge des Völkerrechts, 2. Auflage, Heidelberg 2000

External links
 European Journal of International Law – State Succession in Respect of Human Rights Treaties
 Wilfried Fiedler: Der Zeitfaktor im Recht der Staatensukzession, in: Staat und Recht. Festschrift für Günther Winkler, Wien, 1997. P. 217–236. 
 Wilfried Fiedler: Staatensukzession und Menschenrechte, in: B. Ziemske u.a. (Hrsg.), Festschrift für Martin Kriele, München 1997. P. 1371–1391 
 Draft Articles on Nationality of Natural Persons in relation to the Succession of States with commentaries (1999)
  - Published online on 5 August 2011

Historiography
International law